The following list of Carnegie libraries in Idaho provides detailed information on United States Carnegie libraries in Idaho, where 11 libraries were built from 11 grants (totaling over $138,000) awarded by the Carnegie Corporation of New York from 1903 to 1914. As of 2010, 9 of these buildings are still standing, and 3 still operate as libraries.

Key

Carnegie libraries

Notes

References

Note: The above references, while all authoritative, are not entirely mutually consistent. Some details of this list may have been drawn from one of the references (usually Jones) without support from the others.  Reader discretion is advised.

Idaho
Libraries
 
Libraries